AMC is an American multinational basic cable television channel that is the flagship property of AMC Networks. The channel's programming primarily consists of theatrically released films, along with a limited amount of original programming. The channel's name originally stood for "American Movie Classics", but since 2002 the full name has been de-emphasized as a result of a major shift in its programming.

As of July 2015, AMC was received by approximately 94,832,000 households in the United States that subscribe to a pay television service (81.5% of U.S. households with at least one television set).

History

1984–2002: Focus on classic films
American Movie Classics, as AMC was originally known, debuted on October 1, 1984, as a premium channel by Rainbow Programming Services (a subsidiary of Cablevision). Its original format focused on classic movies – largely those made prior to the 1970s – that aired during the afternoon and early evening hours in a commercial-free, generally unedited, uncut and uncolorized format. The new network replaced Montage, a channel with a similar format that was being offered to Cablevision subscribers in the New York area.

In 1985, Rainbow became involved in a dispute with Ted Turner's Turner Broadcasting System over broadcast rights to the MGM/UA film library. On July 30 of that year, Rainbow had paid $45 million to license up to 800 pre-1950 films from the library. Weeks later, Turner announced an agreement to purchase the film studio with the intention of airing the films on his Superstation WTBS. Rainbow claimed it had exclusive basic cable rights to the films for the next five years. Despite its widespread cable carriage, Turner claimed that because WTBS was a broadcast station, the restriction did not apply. This led to both companies filing lawsuits in September against each other and MGM/UA terminating the agreement with Rainbow because Rainbow allegedly breached it when it announced its intention to offer AMC to cable providers as both a basic and a premium service. By October, the lawsuit were settled with Rainbow receiving $50 million  and an agreement to terminate the licensing deal on December 31, 1985, before which time AMC would not be allowed to convert to a basic service. Turner would go on to complete the acquisition of MGM in early-1986, but his ownership would be very short-lived with him selling it back to the previous owner months later. However, he would retain the film library and execute his original plan to air the movies on WTBS and later on his new networks Turner Network Television and Turner Classic Movies (a direct competitor to AMC).

The new movie network struggled to gain carriage. By March 1986, it had only 300,000 subscribers. To solve this problem, Cablevision and CBS (which became half owner of Rainbow about a year earlier) worked out a deal with the nation's largest cable television provider, Tele-Communications Inc. (TCI). TCI gained a one-third interest in AMC (but not Bravo, Rainbow's other network) and in exchange made AMC available as an offering for most of its 3.9 million subscribers. (TCI's Liberty Media division eventually would create another premium service—Encore, which also originally focused on older films, mainly from the 1960s to the 1980s – five years later in April 1991). During its early years, it was not uncommon for AMC to host a marathon of Marx Brothers films, or show classics such as the original 1925 release of The Phantom of the Opera. In 1987, the channel began to be carried on the basic cable tiers of many cable providers. In July 1988, AMC added its first original programming: Classic Stories From Classic Stars (featuring interviews), followed later that year by Star Facts (biographies) and a mini-documentary series Making of a Classic. By 1989, AMC was available to 39 million subscribers in the U.S.

On December 1, 1990, AMC began operating on a 24-hour-a-day schedule.

Beginning in 1993, AMC presented an annual Film Preservation Festival to raise awareness of and funding for film preservation. Coordinated with The Film Foundation, an industry group that was founded by acclaimed director Martin Scorsese, the festival was originally conceived as a multi-day marathon presenting rare and previously lost films, many airing for the first time on television, along with behind-the-scenes reports on the technical and monetary issues faced by those engaged in archival restoration. Portions of the festival were often dedicated to all-day marathons focusing on a single performer. During its fifth anniversary year in 1998, Scorsese credited the Festival for creating "not only a greater awareness, but [...] more of an expectation now to see restored films." In 1996, curator of the Museum of Modern Art Mary Lee Bandy called the Festival "the most important public event in support of film preservation." By its tenth anniversary in 2003, the Festival had raised $2 million from the general public, which The Film Foundation divided among its five-member archives.

In 1993, Cablevision's Rainbow Media division became the majority owner of the channel, when it bought out Liberty Media's 50% stake in AMC; incidentally in August of that year, Liberty announced its intent to purchase the 25% stake in the channel that Cablevision held at the time, with the Turner Broadcasting System helping to finance the buyout that included an option for TBS to eventually acquire AMC outright. The following year, Time Warner (which later purchased rival Turner Classic Movies following the company's 1996 acquisition of the Turner Broadcasting System) also attempted to acquire at least part of Liberty Media's stake in AMC.

In June 1995, AMC became involved with another dispute with Turner. It filed a $550 million breach of contract lawsuit against Turner Entertainment, which alleged that the company violated AMC's exclusive cable television rights to the pre-1950 Warner Bros. Pictures film library to broadcast approximately 30 times between July 1994 and April 1995, charging that Turner's objective in violating the contract was "to gain unfair advantage for the Turner Classic Movies cable network (which debuted in April 1994) at the expense of AMC."; Turner owns rights to the RKO Radio Pictures film library and licensed RKO's films to AMC in an output deal that was slated to last through 2004. Under the terms of the deal, AMC obtained the RKO titles in exclusive windows.

Around this time, General Electric/NBC owned a stake in AMC – which it divested in the early 2000s. From 1996 to 1998, AMC aired its first original series, Remember WENN, a half-hour scripted series about a radio station during the peak of radio's influence in the 1930s. The show was well received by both critics and its enthusiastic fans, but was abruptly cancelled after its fourth season following management changes at the channel (WENN was followed up by The Lot, which lasted for only 16 episodes). Despite a well publicized write-in campaign to save the series, the show was not renewed for its originally scheduled fifth season.

One popular AMC program was American Pop! (originally intended as a preview of a new 24-hour cable channel), which ran from 1998 to 2003 and featured movies from the 1950s and 1960s aimed at baby boomers (such as Beach Blanket Bingo and Ski Party). Of particular interest to movie completists were the segments that AMC played to fill out the timeslot (Saturday nights from 10:00 p.m. to 12:00 a.m. Eastern Time): classic movie trailers, drive-in movie ads and snipes (bits extolling viewers to visit the snack bar, etc.), along with music videos cribbed from movie musicals from the period.

The majority of the films presented on AMC during the 1990s had originally been released by Paramount Pictures, 20th Century Fox, Columbia Pictures, and Universal Pictures. The channel also occasionally showed classic silent films. The regular hosts of the telecasts were Bob Dorian and later, Nick Clooney (brother of singer Rosemary and father of actor and businessman George), as well as New York City radio personality Gene Klavan from WNEW (1130 AM, now WBBR). Another WNEW alum, Al "Jazzbo" Collins, provided his voice for the "Jazzbo's Swingin' Soundies" series of interstitials.

For most of its first 18 years in existence, AMC provided uncut and uncolorized films without commercial interruption. Its revenue came from carriage fees provided by the cable providers that maintained carriage agreements with the channel. However, in 1998, AMC began accepting traditional advertising, incorporating limited commercial interruptions between films (its sister movie channel Romance Classics, which had launched only one year earlier, became an entirely ad-supported channel at that point). By 2001, AMC had also incorporated commercial breaks during its movie telecasts. As a result of this move, Turner Classic Movies became the only one of the two classic film-focused networks to present their films commercial-free.

2002–2009: Format change and expansion into original programming

On September 30, 2002, AMC underwent a significant rebranding, changing its format from a classic movie channel, broadening to a more general focus on movies from all eras – as well as shortening its name to just the "AMC" abbreviation, and introducing a new logo (a rectangular outline with a lowercase and uppercase "aMC" text) and a new slogan that says TV for Movie people. Kate McEnroe, then-president of Rainbow Media, cited lack of subsidies from cable providers as the reason for the addition of advertising, and cited ad agencies who insist on programming relevant to their products' consumers as the reason for the shift to recent movies instead of just classics. At the time of the format switchover, the company also attempted to launch a spin-off digital cable channel, AMC's Hollywood Classics, which would have required viewers to pay an extra fee to receive the channel. This commercial-free channel would have aired black-and-white classics from the 1930s through the 1950s that American Movie Classics had been airing up until its format changeover; however, the new channel never debuted.

The network also gradually brought back original programming. In 2004, AMC aired its first reality series, FilmFakers; the show featured out-of-work actors who believed they were auditioning for a major role in a real movie, only to be told that they were the subject of a prank and no film actually existed. A New York Times article on the show said that "FilmFakers may go down as one of the meanest reality series yet." From 2003 to 2007, AMC was a channel focused on American films partially classics as well as documentaries about film history such as Backstory and Movies that Shook the World.

On September 1, 2006, AMC officially became available in Canada for cable customers of Shaw Cable and satellite customers of Shaw Direct (formerly StarChoice), marking the first time the network was made available outside the United States.

In late 2007 the network debuted its first original drama series Mad Men, a period piece about Madison Avenue advertising executives in the 1960s. The show was immediately lauded by critics, and won 16 Primetime Emmy Awards and a Peabody Award. Breaking Bad, a drama about a cancer-stricken chemistry teacher involved in making and dealing methamphetamine (played by Bryan Cranston, who had been known primarily for comedic roles in series such as Malcolm in the Middle prior to the series), premiered in 2008; also garnering critical acclaim, winning 16 Primetime Emmy Awards. Breaking Bad and Mad Men ended their runs in 2013 and 2015, respectively, with the former receiving a spin-off in the form of Better Call Saul.

2009–2013: "Story Matters Here"
On May 31, 2009, during the second-season finale of Breaking Bad, AMC rebranded with the introduction of a new slogan, "Story Matters Here". Later that year, the network premiered its second miniseries, The Prisoner. On January 4, 2010, AMC began airing infomercials on Monday through Saturday mornings from 6:00 to 9:00 a.m. Eastern Time; the Saturday morning infomercial block was eliminated after its March 25, 2011, airing as AMC added a Saturday block of western series and films the following week. 2010 also saw the premieres of Rubicon and The Walking Dead. While Rubicon was cancelled, The Walking Dead became an enormous success and has become the most watched scripted program in basic cable history.

In 2011, Cablevision spun off Rainbow Media into a separate company, which was renamed AMC Networks, after its flagship cable network. Cablevision founder Charles Dolan and his family continue to retain a controlling interest in the company. Also during this year, the network introduced two new dramas (The Killing and Hell on Wheels), two original web series (The Trivial Pursuits of Arthur Banks and The Walking Dead: Torn Apart), and the Walking Dead discussion series Talking Dead. In 2012, AMC premiered three original reality series: The Pitch, Comic Book Men and Small Town Security; along with a second web series spun off from The Walking Dead, The Walking Dead: Cold Storage.

2012 Dish Network carriage dispute

2013–present: "Something More"

On March 31, 2013, during the third-season finale of The Walking Dead, AMC unveiled a rebranding campaign with the new slogan "Something More", and inverted the logo from a rectangular outlined box to a solid gold block with the network's acronymic name retained in the center. 2013 saw the channel's unscripted slate double with the additions of Owner's Manual, Showville, the second part of the final season of Breaking Bad, the Breaking Bad discussion series Talking Bad, and the second season of the unscripted series Freakshow, before being cancelled.

Also in April, Rectify, which was originally developed for AMC, premiered on AMC's sister channel Sundance Channel to jump-start that network's emerging slate of original scripted programming. It was then followed by the July announcement that fellow sister channel WE tv had picked up another series originally developed for AMC for the 2012-13 development slate, The Divide, to series. During this timeframe, AMC had started to run marathons of certain shows and cross-promote programs from its co-owned sister channels.

In July 2013, the network announced that it had given series orders for two dramas: Turn: Washington's Spies (which premiered on April 6, 2014) and Halt and Catch Fire (which premiered on June 1, 2014). This marked the first time that AMC had four pilot orders picked up to series in the same cycle, the other two being The Divide and Low Winter Sun (the latter premiered on August 11, 2013, after the season premiere of the final season of Breaking Bad). The former two would both be renewed for second seasons while the latter two were cancelled after their first seasons. AMC would then pick up Into the Badlands up for a six episode first season and Breaking Bad spinoff Better Call Saul for two seasons.

Shift away from unscripted programming

On October 9, 2014, it was announced that AMC would scrap its entire current and future unscripted slate outside Talking Dead and Comic Book Men. This announcement came shortly after AMC took over the United States co-production of the sci-fi drama Humans from Xbox Entertainment Studios. AMC Media recently bought the European media giant Chello Media from Liberty Global. At the end of October, it was announced that AMC had won the bidding war to air the miniseries The Night Manager. In November, AMC Networks renamed the European MGM Channel to AMC. In January 2015, the Asian MGM channel also became AMC as well. In January 2015, AMC announced that they would be airing the eight part miniseries The Making of the Mob: New York.

In March 2015, Sling TV announced it would soon add AMC Networks (including BBC America, IFC, Sundance TV, and We TV) to its service.

In 2016, AMC introduced a new slate of original unscripted series, including Ride with Norman Reedus, Geeking Out, and new expansions of the Talking Dead format with Talking Saul, Talking Preacher, and Talking with Chris Hardwick.

Programming

Series programming

Although movies remain an integral part of AMC's schedule, the network has garnered attention in recent years for its original series. The channel's first original series was the game show The Movie Masters, which ran from 1989 to 1990 and was otherwise notable for being Gene Rayburn's last hosting role; outside Remember WENN and Filmfakers, most of AMC's original programming prior to September 2007 consisted of film history-related documentary and review programs. The establishment of Mad Men in 2007, followed by that of Breaking Bad in 2008, and Better Call Saul in 2015 , has given AMC a reputation on par with premium cable networks HBO and Showtime, both of which rejected Mad Men before it came to AMC.

AMC also airs acquired programming, ranging from black-and-white filmed shows (such as The Rifleman and shorts from The Three Stooges) to contemporary series (such as CSI: Miami).

Movie library
AMC maintains movie licensing rights agreements with Warner Bros. Entertainment, Metro-Goldwyn-Mayer (including films from United Artists and library content from The Samuel Goldwyn Company, Orion Pictures, and Cannon Group), Universal Studios (including some films from DreamWorks Animation as titles from Illumination Entertainment and most from Focus Features are absent), Paramount Pictures (including films from DreamWorks Pictures), Walt Disney Studios Motion Pictures (primarily film content from Touchstone Pictures, 20th Century Studios, Searchlight Pictures, Disney, Walt Disney Animation Studios, and Buena Vista International, while titles from Pixar, Lucasfilm, much of Marvel Studios, and the defunct Blue Sky Studios are not included because of other channels' agreements, including those owned by Disney themselves) and Sony Pictures Entertainment (including Columbia Pictures, TriStar Pictures, Sony Pictures Classics, Screen Gems, and Triumph Films). Since the 2003 format change, the network's film telecasts usually are "television" cuts meant for basic cable, which feature content edits, dubbing of profanities, and some time edits by removing some superfluous plotting or toning down scenes with adult content inappropriate for basic cable broadcast to fit within a set timeslot with commercials added.

FearFest
In 1997, AMC launched "Monsterfest", a popular week-long marathon of horror movies and thrillers that aired from mid- or late October every year for Halloween until the day after Halloween. In the mid-2000s, AMC started a Monsterfest blog on its website, which chronicled news on horror-related film and television productions. In addition, AMC presented "Fear Friday," a horror movie double feature on late Friday evenings. On September 26, 2008, AMC announced the launch of a new horror-themed movie marathon for its October schedule called "Fearfest" (which replaced Monsterfest); coinciding with this, the "Monsterfest" blog was renamed as the "Horror Hacker" blog. "Fearfest" also runs from mid- or late October every year for Halloween until the day after Halloween too and it also sometimes runs throughout the whole month of October during certain years too as well.

Best Christmas Ever 

AMC had typically aired a rotating lineup of five to six Christmas movies during the holiday season. In 2018, the channel introduced a more extensive holiday lineup branded as Best Christmas Ever, running from November 26 to December 25, featuring a mix of popular Christmas and family films, along with other acquired specials. The schedule included notable acquisitions from Warner Bros., including Elf, National Lampoon's Christmas Vacation, The Polar Express, I'll Be Home for Christmas, and 12 Rankin/Bass specials (the films had been recent mainstays of Freeform's competing 25 Days of Christmas schedule, with Elf in particular having received extensive airplay and high viewership during the event), as well as other specials from DreamWorks Animation. As expected, AMC saw ratings gains over the holiday season; primetime viewership for the first two weeks of the event was up 40% year-over-year, airings of Elf and Christmas Vacation both peaked at 1.5 million viewers, and average viewership of feature films on Freeform fell by 36% year-over-year in the same period.

AMC Premiere
AMC Premiere is an add-on subscription service only available as an extra to those already normally subscribed to AMC. It involves access to an expanded On-Demand library compared to the standard "AMC OnDemand" library packaged with the usual cable service. This is necessary to view many "locked" programs on the AMC website (such as complete availability to The Walking Dead all ten seasons) which prompts someone to subscribe for ~$5/mo or ~$30/yr. For currently-airing programs it sometimes gives early access to viewing them before they debut on the main AMC channel.

AMC+ 

AMC+ is a premium, commercial-free streaming bundle that includes the same benefits of AMC Premiere, early access to additional AMC series, as well as additional library content from sister networks BBC America, IFC, and SundanceTV, and the complete collections of fellow AMC Networks streaming services including Shudder, Sundance Now and IFC Films Unlimited. The service is available through most streaming services for $8.99 per month like Apple TV, Amazon Prime Video and Roku and it's also at a reduced price for existing AMC channel subscribers too like Xfinity, Dish Network and Sling TV.

References

External links

Television networks in the United States
Television channels and stations established in 1984
English-language television stations in the United States
Movie channels in the United States
AMC Networks
1984 establishments in the United States